Pieter Daniël de Wet (18 August 1861, Dewetsdorp, South Africa – 27 February 1929, Lindley, Free State, South Africa) was a Boer general in the Anglo-Boer War (1899–1902) and a younger brother of Boer general and politician Christiaan de Wet. Piet de Wet participated in the Battle of Poplar Grove (7 March 1900), the Battle of Sanna's Post (Sannaspos, 31 March 1900) for the waterworks there, and defeated the 13th Battalion Imperial Yeomanry at Lindley (31 May 1900). In July 1900 he surrendered to the British at Kroonstad, Orange Free State.

Early career
De Wet was born at the farm Nuwejaarsfontein in Dewetsdorp as one of the fourteen children of Jacobus Ignatius de Wet (13 July 1823, Boonjieskraal, Caledon, Western Cape – 1891, Dewetsdorp) and Aletta Susanna Margaretha Strydom (28 February 1828, Caledon – 16 May 1870, Dewetsdorp). With his older brother Christiaan he left the Orange Free State in 1879 for the Heidelberg district in the South African Republic. Both brothers fought in the First Boer War (1880–1881) at the Battle of Majuba Hill and Piet de Wet participated in the expedition to capture Mampuru II.

In 1883 he returned to the Free State, settled at the farm Vinkfontein near Lindley and married Susanna Margaretha de Wet (18 September 1865, Kroonstad, Orange Free State, South Africa – 26 August 1924). They had five sons and six daughters. De Wet represented Midden-Liebensbergvlei-wyk in the Volksraad from 1895 to 1897, moved to Pretoria but came back and became military commander (veldkornet) for Lindley.

Anglo-Boer War 1899–1902

Success
Piet de Wet led his 200 men of the Bethlehem Commando near Nicholson's Nek outside Ladysmith on 5 October 1899 and during the siege of Ladysmith. Then he was tasked to march west and attack Vaalkop near Arundel on 16 December 1899. He impressed president Steyn of the Free State who gave him the command of all troops south of the Orange River with headquarter at Colesberg. British troops continued their advance and occupied Bloemfontein, the capital of Orange Free State, on 13 March 1900. On 28 May Orange Free State was annexed by Lord Roberts as the Orange River Colony. But in the mean time the brothers Christiaan and Piet de Wet won skirmishes with the British at Abrahamkraal (10 March), Sanna's Post (Sannaspost, 31 March) and Dewetsdorp (20 April). On 31 May 1900 Piet de Wet with General Marthinus Prinsloo captured 13th Battalion Imperial Yeomanry near Lindley. Piet de Wet bagged in total 530 men, including Spragge, Lord Longford, Lords Ennismore, Leitrim and Donoughmore (and the future Lord Craigavon) who were marched off to the eastern Transvaal northwards. However, after the occupation by Roberts of Kroonstad on 12 May 1900  Free State soldiers were disheartenend and Piet de Wet had started to doubt the use of fighting on. Roberts occupied and Pretoria on 5 June 1900.

Surrender
On 18 May 1900 British brigade general Robert Broadwood received a message that Piet de Wet was willing to surrender on the condition that he and his men could return to their farms. However, Commander-in-chief Roberts demanded an unconditional surrender so that the fighting continued. But in July 1900 Piet de Wet and several of his staff surrendered to the British at Kroonstad, becoming "joiners", "hensoppers" (hands-upper), and "wapenneerlêers" (who put down their weapons). His unavailing letter of 11 January 1901 to his brother Christiaan de Wet to stop his guerilla war, was published in the Bloemfontein Post and separately as a pamphlet "Broeder tot broeder" (Brother to Brother). In March 1902 Piet de Wet established the Orange River Colony Volunteers on the British side. and had joined the National Scouts headd by Andries Crnjé, who served the Britsh troops as Boer auxiliaries. However, on 9 April 1902 peace negotiations started at Vereeniging leading to the Treaty of Vereeniging on 31 May 1902 ending the war.

Publications
 Broeder tot broeder : een prijzenswaardige brief [aan zijn broeder, Kommandant Christiaan De Wet gezonden] ; een smeekstem tot De Wet [en] De Wet's verantwoordelijkheid, 1901.

 with Kroonstad Vredes Comité (translation: Kroonstad Peace Committee), Open brief aan de inwoners der Kaap Kolonie, Die Comité, Kroonstad, 1901.
 The Marits conspiracy : negotiations with German South West during 1913, Wallachs, Pretoria, 1915.

Bibliography
 M. P. Bossenbroek, Yvette Rosenberg (Translator), The Boer War, Seven Stories Press, New York, NY, 2018. , 1609807472. Pages 229, 231, 240, 277–279, 314–315, 383.
 Darrell Hall, The Hall Handbook of the Anglo-Boer War, 1899–1902, Pietermaritzburg: University of Natal Press, 1999. . Pages 23 and 148.
 Thomas Pakenham, The Boer War, George Weidenfeld & Nicolson, London, 1979. Abacus, 1992. . Pages 393, 424, 436–437, 488, 542, 568.

References

1861 births
1929 deaths
Orange Free State people
Afrikaner people
People of the First Boer War
Orange Free State generals
South African military personnel
Orange Free State military personnel of the Second Boer War
Boer generals